Nérée Tétreau (April 12, 1842 – January 25, 1911) was a Canadian notary, land owner, and political figure in Quebec. He represented Ottawa electoral district in the Legislative Assembly of Quebec from 1892 to 1897 as a Conservative.

Early life and education 
Tétreau was born in Saint-Damase, Canada East, the son of Antoine Tétreau and Adélaïde Ayet, dit Malo. He was educated at the Séminaire de Saint-Hyacinthe and the Séminaire de Sainte-Marie-de-Monnoir.

Career 
Tétreau qualified to practise as a notary in 1866 and set up practice in Hull, Quebec. Tétreau was secretary-treasurer for the Hull school board from 1866 to 1868 and for the town of Hull from 1870 to 1875.

The Val-Tétreau neighbourhood and Val-Tétreau District of Gatineau were named in his honour.

Personal life 
In 1868, he married Adèle Leduc. He died in Hull at the age of 68.

References
 

Conservative Party of Quebec MNAs
1842 births
1911 deaths